Miss Teen USA 1988, the 6th Miss Teen USA pageant, was televised live from San Bernardino, California on July 25, 1988.  At the conclusion of the final competition, Mindy Duncan of Oregon was crowned by outgoing queen Kristi Addis of Mississippi.

This was the first of two years the pageant was held in San Bernardino. It was hosted by Dick Clark for the first time, He would later host the Miss USA Pageants from 1989 to 1993 and Miss Universe Pageants from 1990 to 1993 and returned to The Miss Teen USA Pageants in 1991 on CBS and remained as host until 1993, with color commentary from Tracy Scoggins.

This was also the last time the State Costume competition took place and would not return until thirty-three years later in 2021, under a different organization.

Results

Placements

Special awards

Final competition scores

 Winner 
 First runner-up
 Second runner-up 
 Third runner-up
 Fourth runner-up

Historical significance 
 Oregon wins competition for the first time. Also becoming in the 6th state who wins Miss Teen USA.
 New York earns the 1st runner-up position for the first time. 
 Louisiana earns the 2nd runner-up position for the second time and matches the same position as the previous year.
 Illinois earns the 3rd runner-up position for the first time.
 Alabama earns the 4th runner-up position for the first time.
 States that placed in semifinals the previous year were Louisiana, Mississippi and New York. 
 Louisiana and New York placed for the third consecutive year.
 Mississippi made its second consecutive placement.
 New Jersey, New Mexico, Texas and West Virginia last placed in 1986.
 Illinois last placed in 1985.
 Oregon last placed in 1984.
 Alabama placed for the first time.
 Oklahoma breaks an ongoing streak of placements since 1986.

Delegates
The Miss Teen USA 1988 delegates were:

 Alabama - Anna Mingus
 Alaska - Joleen Jeffcoat
 Arizona - Kristen Peterson
 Arkansas - Jessica Welch
 California - Alison Moreno (disqualified)
 Colorado - Leah Crawford
 Connecticut - Bobbie Jo Shanahan
 Delaware - Edith Senter
 District of Columbia - Sabrina Curtis
 Florida - Holly Nicholson
 Georgia - Erin Nance
 Hawaii - Michelle Wong
 Idaho - Renee Griggs
 Illinois - Kathleen McLelland
 Indiana - Deborah Lindboe
 Iowa - Stacy Horst
 Kansas - Jennifer Eastes
 Kentucky - Marti Hendricks
 Louisiana - Amy Pietsch
 Maine - Christine Despres
 Maryland - Sherry Twilley
 Massachusetts - Alicia Gawrys
 Michigan - Melissa Sinkevics
 Minnesota - Julie Ward
 Mississippi - Honey East
 Missouri - Beverly Boatright
 Montana - Kristen Anderson
 Nebraska - Pamela Brown
 Nevada - Erin Abernathy
 New Hampshire - Christa Jones
 New Jersey - Michelle Knipfelberg
 New Mexico - Jill Vasquez
 New York -  Jessica Collins
 North Carolina - Michelle Moore
 North Dakota - Jennifer Seminary
 Ohio - Teresa Merola
 Oklahoma - Linda Parsons
 Oregon - Mindy Duncan 
 Pennsylvania - Desiree Fess
 Rhode Island - Debbie Peters
 South Carolina - Nicole Adams
 South Dakota - Jillayne Fossum
 Tennessee - Missy Pierce
 Texas - Libby Pelton
 Utah - Kathleen Treadway
 Vermont - Andrea Varney
 Virginia - Audra Wilks
 Washington - Karen Petre
 West Virginia - Wendy Stephens
 Wisconsin - Jennifer Schwalenberg
 Wyoming - Michele Apostoles

Contestant notes
After competing in the preliminary competition and winning the Best State Costume award, Alison Moreno (California) was disqualified from the final competition after she left her room without a chaperone, contrary to pageant rules.
Delegates who later competed in the Miss USA pageant were:
Jillayne Fossum (South Dakota) - Miss South Dakota USA 1991
Erin Nance (Georgia) - Miss Georgia USA 1993 (first runner-up at Miss USA 1993)
Jennifer Seminary (North Dakota) - Miss North Dakota USA 1993
Kristen Anderson (Montana) - Miss Montana USA 1993
Jill Vasquez (New Mexico) - Miss New Mexico USA 1994
Anna Mingus (Alabama) - Miss Alabama USA 1995
Audra Wilks (Virginia) - Miss Virginia USA 1997
Jill Vasquez became one of the directors of the Miss California USA and Miss California Teen USA pageants in 2007.
Jessica Collins became a successful actress who played Meredith Davies on Tru Calling.

Judges
Roz Ryan
Allison Brown - Miss Teen USA 1986 from Oklahoma
Paul Kreppel
Marina Sirtis
Sean Hamilton
Tatyanna
Umberto
Dean Butler
Judy Zerafa
Christy Fichtner - Miss USA 1986 from Texas
Scott Hamilton

References

External links
Yahoo! TV Complete list of pageant judges, personnel, and production crew for the CBS broadcast

1988
1988 beauty pageants
1988 in California